Paddy Murphy is an Irish sportsperson.  He plays hurling with his local club Nenagh Éire Óg and with the Tipperary senior inter-county team.

Career
He played in the All-Ireland Under-21 Hurling Championship for Tipperary from 2009 until 2011, winning the Championship in 2010.
He was named in the Tipperary squad for the 2014 National Hurling League.

Honours
Tipperary
 All-Ireland Under-21 Hurling Championship (1): 2010
 Munster Under-21 Hurling Championship (1): 2010
 All-Ireland Minor Hurling Championship (1): 2007
 Munster Minor Hurling Championship (1): 2007
 Waterford Crystal Cup (1): 2014

References

External links
 Tipperary GAA Player Profile

Living people
1990 births
Nenagh Éire Óg hurlers
Tipperary inter-county hurlers
UCD hurlers